Petino is a rural locality (a selo) and the administrative center of Petinskoye Rural Settlement, Khokholsky District, Voronezh Oblast, Russia. The population was 937 as of 2010. There are 12 streets.

Geography 
Petino is located on the right bank of the Don River, 27 km east of Khokholsky (the district's administrative centre) by road. Orlovka is the nearest rural locality.

References 

Rural localities in Khokholsky District